is a Japanese serialized morning television drama series that was broadcast on NHK. It aired a total of 156 episodes from April 1 to September 28, 2002. Each episode of the series was 15 minutes long, airing every morning except Sunday.  It chronicles the life of Matsushita Sakura, a Japanese-American from Hawaii who moves to a small town in Japan to be an assistant language teacher for Japanese middle-school students.

Premise 
Sakura Matsushita, a Sansei (third-generation) Japanese-American living in Hawaii, who comes to Japan to live with her grandparents. Later, she moves because she has to teach English to Japanese middle-school students as an assistant language teacher. There she learns many valuable lessons and makes new friends.

Cast 
 Shiho Takano - Elizabeth Sakura Matsushita (primary character)
 Hideji Otaki - James Takero Matsushita (Sakura's grandfather, narrator)
 Yukiyoshi Ozawa - Keisuke Katsuragi
 Ken Teraizumi - Ichiro Matsushita
 Hiromi Ōta as Kyoko Matsushita (Sakura's mother)
 Keiko Tsushima - Toshiko Matsushita
 Kaori Itakura - Momo Matsushita (Sakura's sister)
 Thane Camus - Robert Hoffman (Sakura's fiancé)

Alphabet Words Taught

Episodes

Episodes  1–13 
Robert proposes to Sakura and she accepts...only in one condition. She wants to go to Japan first before she gets married. It has always been her dream to go to Japan and see her Japanese side. Her father doesn't want her to go at first, but later he decides that she may go as long as she goes to teach English to the Japanese students. When she gets to Japan she sees her grandparents. Her grandfather acts like he doesn't want Sakura there at his home, but actually he does. She can not stay at their house for long though because of her work. The principal of the school that she is supposed to be working at claims that she must go to another school and teach English there. Since she promised her father that she will go to Japan and teach, she kept her promise and moved out of her grandparents house and left to go to the other school. There she will meet many new people. The male health/Gym teacher will be living in the same house that she will be living at which is free for them to stay at because the school lends it to them. Sakura also goes to a small restaurant owned by American people. They all speak Japanese and Sakura and the people there become good friends. The other English teacher at her school is fake. He barely knows English and Sakura does not appreciate the fact that he teaches. She wants to teach the English language in a more interesting way so all the students will have fun while they are learning. All the other teachers does not accept that way of teaching so Sakura gets very upset and leaves the school. She lies to her grandparents that school is closed and stays at their home. Soon the health/Gym teacher calls to see where she is and discovers that she was lying to her grandparents. Her grandfather tells her that she will go back to the school whether she quits or stays.

Episodes 14–17 
Sakura goes back to the school, apologizes for missing school and gets back on schedule. She becomes very close to the health/Gym teacher. A rumor gets around that Sakura and the health/Gym teacher are going out and the students even draw hearts on the chalk board. The nurse actually likes the health/Gym teacher and is upset of this situation. The rest of the teachers are upset also. Not because they like him but they believe that if they are going out, then they will not concentrate on the work that needs to be done. Sakura tells everyone that she has no interest in him by showing everyone the picture of Robert and her. The Gym/Health teacher and Sakura must go talk to the student's parents, so they go together at first but later decide that they would finish much quicker if they went to each house separately. So they do and of course Sakura gets lost. But with some help of the town people she finds the first house she is supposed to go to. The first house is a candle shop. She meets the entire family and enjoys the big old fashion house. She loves it there. Then, an offer came for her to come live with them and Sakura definitely agrees to stay.

Episodes 18–25 
Sakura is enjoying her stay but seems like her student and his mother doesn't. At school the info gets out and the other students talk about it. Not only is there trouble at school, but there is trouble also stored for them at home. The younger sister comes back home saying that she is getting a divorce with her husband and she is expecting to stay at her parents' house back in her old room until she notices Sakura in there...

External links 
 

2002 Japanese television series debuts
2002 Japanese television series endings
Asadora